14335 Alexosipov, provisional designation , is a stony Flora asteroid from the inner regions of the asteroid belt, approximately 4 kilometers in diameter. It was discovered by Soviet–Russian astronomer Nikolai Chernykh at the Crimean Astrophysical Observatory in Nauchnyj, on 3 September 1981. The asteroid was named after astronomer Alexandr Osipov.

Orbit and classification 

Alexosipov is a member of the Flora family, one of the largest groups of stony asteroids. It orbits the Sun in the inner main-belt at a distance of 1.8–2.7 AU once every 3 years and 4 months (1,220 days). Its orbit has an eccentricity of 0.21 and an inclination of 6° with respect to the ecliptic. The first astrometric observations were already made at the discovering observatory in 1971, 10 years prior to its discovery. However, these observations were not used to extend the asteroid's observation arc.

Physical characteristics 

Alexosipov has been characterized as a common S-type asteroid by Pan-STARRS photometric survey.

Rotation period 

A rotational lightcurve of Alexosipov was obtained from photometric observations made by American astronomer Brian Skiff in October 2011. It gave a well-defined rotation period of  hours with a low brightness variation of 0.10 in magnitude. A low brightness amplitude typically indicates that the body has a nearly spheroidal shape.

Diameter and albedo 

According to the survey carried out by the NEOWISE mission of NASA's space-based Wide-field Infrared Survey Explorer, Alexosipov measures 4.2 kilometers in diameter and its surface has an albedo of 0.279, while the Collaborative Asteroid Lightcurve Link assumes an albedo of 0.24 – which derives from 8 Flora, the largest member and namesake of this orbital family – and calculates a diameter of 3.9 kilometers with an absolute magnitude of 14.2.

Naming 

This minor planet was named in memory of astronomer Alexandr Kuzmich Osipov (1920–2004), observer of artificial satellites, the Moon, planets and comets at the Astronomical Observatory of Kyiv National University in Kiev, Ukraine. He is described as a skilled teacher for many generations of students. The approved naming citation was published by the Minor Planet Center on 15 December 2005.

152217 Akosipov, discovered 2005, is also named for Aleksandr Osipov.

Notes

References

External links 
 Astronomical Observatory, Kyiv Shevchenko National University
 Asteroid Lightcurve Database (LCDB), query form (info )
 Dictionary of Minor Planet Names, Google books
 Asteroids and comets rotation curves, CdR – Observatoire de Genève, Raoul Behrend
 Discovery Circumstances: Numbered Minor Planets (10001)-(15000) – Minor Planet Center
 
 

014335
Discoveries by Nikolai Chernykh
Named minor planets
19810903